"Boom Boom Boom" is a song by American hip house duo the Outhere Brothers, released in June 1995 as the fourth single from their debut album, 1 Polish, 2 Biscuits & a Fish Sandwich (1994), and is also featured on their compilation albums The Fucking Hits (2002), and Dance History (2005). It peaked at number 54 on the Cash Box Top 100 and number 65 on the Billboard Hot 100. Outside of the United States, "Boom Boom Boom" topped the charts in Germany, the Republic of Ireland, and the United Kingdom. In the latter two countries, the song became the duo's second chart-topper. The original version contained sexually explicit lyrics which were removed for the radio edit but were retained in remixes of the track on the single.

American entertainment company BuzzFeed ranked "Boom Boom Boom" number 71 in their list of "The 101 Greatest Dance Songs of the '90s" in 2017.

Chart performance
"Boom Boom Boom" was very successful on the chart on several continents, becoming the duo's biggest hit to date. In Europe, it topped the charts in Germany, the Republic of Ireland, and the United Kingdom. In the latter country, it peaked at the top of the UK Singles Chart on  July 2, 1995– for the week ending date July 8, 1995– during its fourth week on the chart, becoming The Outhere Brothers' second chart-topping song in Britain following "Don't Stop (Wiggle Wiggle)" in March 1995. It spent a total of four weeks at the top of the UK Singles Chart. 

Additionally, the single reached the top ten in Austria, Denmark, Finland, France, Iceland, Italy, Norway, Spain, Sweden (number two), and Switzerland, as well as on the Eurochart Hot 100, where it peaked at number three. Outside of Europe, "Boom Boom Boom" went to number-one on the RPM Dance/Urban chart in Canada and in Zimbabwe, number two in Australia, number eight in New Zealand, number 54 on the Cash Box Top 100 and number 65 on the Billboard Hot 100 in the Outhere Brothers' native United States. The song was awarded with a gold record in France and New Zealand and a platinum record in Australia and the UK.

Critical reception
James Masterton wrote in his weekly UK chart commentary, that "now the lads return with their second hit, possessing none of the novelty or even slight charm of the first. Top 20 on the name alone, but no further on its merits." James Hamilton from Music Weeks RM Dance Update said the song is "neither as blatantly filthy nor as good" as "Don't Stop (Wiggle Wiggle)", describing it as a "similar catchy 'I say boom boom boom, now let me hear you say whey-yo chanter".

Music video
Two different music videos for the song were made. The original video was later published on YouTube in February 2010 and had accumulated over 23million views by September 2021. For the UK/Europe release, a second video was made with animated clips (similar to their previous UK release "Don't Stop (Wiggle Wiggle)" but this time, The Outhere Brothers themselves appeared in front of the footage.

Track listings

 12-inch maxi – U.S. "Boom Boom Boom" (TFX remix) – 4:32
 "Boom Boom Boom" (ohb underground mix (part 2)) – 5:26
 "Boom Boom Boom" (don't break my balls mix) – 4:13
 "Boom Boom Boom" (OHB underground mix (part 4)) – 4:43
 "Boom Boom Boom" (TFX instrumental remix) – 4:32

 12-inch maxi – Italy "Boom Boom Boom" (don't break the balls mix) – 4:10
 "Boom Boom Boom" (OHB radio mix) – 3:34
 "Boom Boom Boom" (OHB underground mix) – 5:26
 "Boom Boom Boom" (OHB extended mix) – 4:55

 12-inch maxi – France "Boom Boom Boom" (don't break my balls mix 2) – 4:13
 "Boom Boom Boom" (extended mix 2) – 4:45
 "Boom Boom Boom" (underground mix 4) – 4:43
 "Boom Boom Boom" (OHB underground mix 2) – 5:26

 12-inch maxi – UK "Boom Boom Boom" (don't break my balls long mix) – 4:13
 "Boom Boom Boom" (TFX long mix) – 4:31
 "Boom Boom Boom" (itchy and scratchy dub) – 6:55

 12-inch maxi – Germany "Boom Boom Boom" (extended mix)
 "Boom Boom Boom" (don't break my balls mix 2)
 "Boom Boom Boom" (underground mix 4)
 "Boom Boom Boom" (OHB underground mix 2)
 "Boom Boom Boom" (don't break my balls mix 1)
 "Boom Boom Boom" (TFX club remix)

 CD single – France "Boom Boom Boom" (don't break my balls radio mix) – 3:00
 "Boom Boom Boom" (OHB radio mix) – 3:34
 "Boom Boom Boom" (UK radio edit) – 3:20

 CD maxi – Australia "Boom Boom Boom" (radio version)
 "Boom Boom Boom" (TFX long mix)
 "Boom Boom Boom" (itchy and scratchy dub)
 "Boom Boom Boom" (OHB underground mix part 2)
 "Boom Boom Boom" (OHB extended mix part 4)
 "Boom Boom Boom" (OHB underground mix part 4)

 CD maxi – Remixes'
 "Boom Boom Boom" (lalala radio mix) – 3:59
 "Boom Boom Boom" (UK radio mix) – 3:34
 "Boom Boom Boom" (lalala remix) – 3:56
 "Boom Boom Boom" (extended mix 2) – 4:45
 "Boom Boom Boom" (don't break my balls mix 2) – 4:13

Charts

Weekly charts

Year-end charts

Certifications

References

The Outhere Brothers songs
1995 singles
UK Singles Chart number-one singles
Number-one singles in Germany
Number-one singles in Scotland
Number-one singles in Zimbabwe
Irish Singles Chart number-one singles
1994 songs